Kevin Aston McLeod (born October 17, 1974) is a former American football fullback in the National Football League who played for the Tampa Bay Buccaneers and Cleveland Browns. He played college football for the Auburn Tigers. He also played in the Arena Football League for the Orlando Predators.

References

1974 births
Living people
American football fullbacks
Tampa Bay Buccaneers players
Cleveland Browns players
Orlando Predators players
Auburn Tigers football players